The 2010 IIHF World Women's U18 Championship was the third junior female world ice hockey championships. It was held from March 27 through April 3, 2010, in Chicago, Illinois. The championship is the Under-18 junior ice hockey edition of the women worlds, organized by the International Ice Hockey Federation (IIHF).

Eight teams played in the top division, and six teams played in Division I.

Teams
The following teams will participate in the championship:

Preliminary round

Group A
Japan's 3–1 victory over Finland is the first time in IIHF history that any Japanese national team had ever beaten a Finnish national team.

Standings

Results
All times local (UTC−5)

Group B

Standings

Results
All times local (UTC−5)

Relegation Round
The relegation round was played as a best-of-three playoff. The Czech Republic sweep hence rendered the last game unnecessary.

This is the first time any Russian national team has ever been officially relegated since the country began international competition in 1954 as part of the Soviet Union. (The senior Russian women's team finished the 2005 World Championships in a relegation position, but an expansion of the 2007 tournament to nine teams in 2007 granted them a reprieve.)

 is relegated to Division I for the 2011 IIHF World Women's U18 Championship.

Final round

Quarterfinals

Semifinals

5th place playoff

Bronze medal game

Gold medal game

Ranking and statistics

Final standings

Scoring leaders
List shows the top skaters sorted by points, then goals. If the list exceeds 10 skaters because of a tie in points, all of the tied skaters are shown.
GP = Games played; G = Goals; A = Assists; Pts = Points; +/− = Plus/minus; PIM = Penalties in minutes; POS = PositionSource: IIHF

Leading goaltenders
Only the top five goaltenders, based on save percentage, who have played 40% of their team's minutes are included in this list.
TOI = Time on ice (minutes:seconds); SA = Shots against; GA = Goals against; GAA = Goals against average; Sv% = Save percentage; SO = ShutoutsSource: IIHF

Tournament awards
Best players selected by the Directorate:
Best Goaltender:  Alex Rigsby
Best Defenceman:  Brigette Lacquette
Best Forward:  Kendall Coyne
MVP:  Jessica Campbell
Source: IIHF

Division I

The tournament was held in Piešťany, Slovakia, from April 3 to April 9, 2010.

 is promoted to Top Division for the 2011 IIHF World Women's U18 Championship

See also
2010 IIHF World U18 Championships (Men)
2010 World Junior Ice Hockey Championships (Men)

References

External links
 Official site of the IIHF

IIHF World Women's U18 Championships
World Women's U18 Championship
World
World
2010
Ice hockey competitions in Chicago
2010 in Illinois
2010s in Chicago
IIHF World Women's U18 Championship
IIHF World Women's U18 Championship
IIHF World Women's U18 Championship